Simone Urdl is a film producer. She co-founded Film Farm Productions with Jennifer Weiss.

Filmography 
 Jack and Jill (1998)
 Soul Cages (1999)
 Luck (2003)
 Queen of the Night (2014)
 Octavio Is Dead! (2018)
 Falls Around Her (2018)
 Guest of Honour (2019)
 The Middle Man (2021)

Recognition 
 2008 Genie Award for Best Motion Picture - Away from Her - Won (shared with Daniel Iron,Jennifer Weiss)
 2001 Genie Award for Best Live Action Short Drama - Soul Cages - Nominated (shared with Phillip Barker)

External links 
 

Canadian film producers
Canadian Screen Award winners
Year of birth missing (living people)
Living people
Canadian women film producers